Wan-Ting Su (born 1982) is a Taiwanese artist who grew up in Hsinchu, in North Taiwan.  She has a M.F.A. degree from the Institute of Plastic Art of Tainan National University of the Arts.  The Ministry of Culture of the Republic of China (Taiwan) selected her for an overseas program, Taiwan's Artists in Residence (A.I.R.), so in 2010 she lived and created works in America for several months. Wan-Ting Su is not only engrossed in painting but also interested in sculpture, installation art, and video art.  Some of her works have been collected by galleries in both Taiwan and Australia.  At present, she is a full-time artist who lives in Taichung.

Art characteristics
In most of Wan-Ting Su's paintings, she depicts many irregular forms similar to seeds or micro-organisms in a "strange fantasy world".  Some of her compositions look like different imaginative streams that converge or flow individually.  The artist takes for granted that every life is so precious that she would like to proclaim its beauty and profundity.

Education
 2007   Tainan National University of Arts- Institute of Plastic Art (M.F.A)
 2005   National Taichung Teachers College- Art Education, Taiwan (B.E)

Honors
 2011   Allowance of art creation, National Culture and Art Foundation, Taiwan
 2009   Selected for Taiwan's Artists in Residence (A.I.R) program of Anderson Ranch Arts Center, America
 2007  "Forest of Art- 99 Mountain Ecology" The Talent Foster Plan.  Subsidy-Visual Art National Taiwan Museum of Fine Art
 2007   The Artist of Stock 20 Taichung Railway station, Art Network of the Railway Warehouses Taiwan

Prizes
 2006   Participant's Award in 2006 Taipei Arts Award, Taipei Fine Arts Museum, Taiwan
 2006   Selected by 2006 Taiwan New Arts-3D Creation, Taichung County Seaport Art Center, Taiwan

Painting works
   Golden River：117x 90cm   Acrylic on Canvas   2011
   Delicate Ping-Pong：100x100cm   Acrylic on Canvas   2011
   Flying Red Snow：130x162cm   Acrylic on Canvas   2011
   Happy Peck：130x162cm   Acrylic on Canvas   2011
  Blogspot
  Youtube I
  Youtube II
  ArtTime

Solo exhibitions
 2013  Mystery Islands, A. Heritage Museum, Taoyuan, Taiwan
 2012  Cheerful Buds in the Early Summer, Powen Gallery & Moons Art Gallery, Taichung & Hsinchu, Taiwan
 2011  Sublime-Beauty, TAIYU Beaux Arts Salon, Chiayi, Taiwan
 2011  Waltz in D Major, ACCTON HALLWAY, Hsinchu, Taiwan
 2010  Symphonic Resonance of Ripples, Mayor’s House, Taichung, Taiwan
 2007  Living for art－Infinity of Propagation & RegenerationSTOCK20, Taichung, Taiwan

Group exhibitions
 2013 ART TAINAN 2013, Tayih Landis Hotel Tainan, Tainan, Taiwan
 2012 Seeing  Landscape, TAIYU Beaux Arts Salon, Chiayi, Taiwan
 2012 New Taiwan mural team Project -Urban guerrilla, Haushan1914, Taipei, Taiwan
 2011 New Taiwan mural team Project -Urban guerrilla, Huwei Puppet museum, Yunlin, Taiwan
 2011 Open Box-Doll Opening, Open Box Art Space, Taichung, Taiwan
 2010 SEE YOU NEXT 10-2010 AVAT exhibition, TADA, Taichung, Taiwan
 2009 Help Victims from Typhoon Morakot with ART Power, Impressions ART Gallery, Contemporary Hall, Taipei, Taiwan
 2009 Duel Regard-The views from Taiwanese Woman Arts, National Taiwan Museum of Fine Arts, Taichung, Taiwan
 2008 Art Fancy-2008 AVAT exhibition, 44 south village, Taipei, Taiwan
 2007 Ending Exhibitions of Seventh Stations Artists, Stock20, Taichung, Taiwan
 2007 Slowing Landscape, 99 peaks Art Ecological Park, Nantou, Taiwan
 2007 Frolic: Humor and Mischief in New Taiwanese Art, Tenri Cultural Institute Gallery, NYC, USA
 2007 Crossing over, Tiger Mountain, Nantou, Taiwan
 2007 Taiwan International Orchid Show 2007- ART Installation, Taiwan.  Orchid Plantation Tainan, Taiwan
 2007  Daughter of champion Red, The Si Erba Art Space, Taichung, Taiwan
 2007  2007 Daci Biennale, TNNUA, Tainan, Taiwan
 2006  2006 Taipei Arts Award, Taipei Fine Arts Museum, Taipei
 2006  2006 New Perspective Arts in Taiwan 3D Creation SeriesTaichung County Seaport Art Center, Taichung, Taiwan
 2006  "Fall in love" dancing with the modern art, Quanta R&D Center, Taoyuan, Taiwan
 2006  Love in the Mountains, TNNUA, Tainan, Taiwan
 2005  The end of Group Exhibitions, TNNUA, Tainan, Taiwan
 2005  Newborn Group Exhibition, TNNUA, Tainan, Taiwan
 2005  Graduation Exhibition of Art and Craft Department of Education 94, NTCT, Taichung, Taiwan
 2004  Nei-Jia-Dao environment art exhibition, PU-Li, Nantou, Taiwan

Others
 Butterfly, Beauty of the world-12 anniversary of the earthquake 921 and paper church park opened the third anniversary of a series of activities Paper Dome Park Butterfly Art Build.

Collections
 2012  White Rabbit Gallery, Sydney, Australia
 2011  TAIYU Beaux Arts Salon, Chiayi, Taiwan
 2011  Open-Box Art Space, Taichung, Taiwan
 2007  TAIYU Beaux Arts Salon, Chiayi, Taiwan
 Private collections

See also
Taiwanese art

References

Taiwanese women artists
Tainan National University of the Arts alumni
1982 births
Living people